The Northeastern Indiana Athletic Conference was an IHSAA-Sanctioned Athletic Conference from 1927 to 1988.

Former members

Membership Timeline

Membership timeline

Divisional Format
From 1973 to 1975, the conference used a two division format. The divisions were:

Resources
 Northeastern Indiana Athletic Conference Football
 NEIC

Indiana high school athletic conferences
Indiana High School Athletic Association disestablished conferences